AEE788 is a multitargeted human epidermal receptor (HER) 1/2 and vascular endothelial growth factor receptor (VEGFR) 1/2 receptor family tyrosine kinases inhibitor with IC50 of 2, 6, 77, 59 nM for EGFR, ErbB2, KDR, and Flt-1. In cells, growth factor-induced EGFR and ErbB2 phosphorylation was also efficiently inhibited with IC50s of 11 and 220 nM, respectively. It efficiently inhibited growth factor-induced EGFR and ErbB2 phosphorylation in tumors for >72 h, a phenomenon correlating with the antitumor efficacy of intermittent treatment schedules. It also inhibits VEGF-induced angiogenesis in a murine implant model. It has potential as an anticancer agent targeting deregulated tumor cell proliferation as well as angiogenic parameters.

The IC50 value of AEE788 against of different kinases

The data of antiproliferative activity of AEE788

References

Protein kinase inhibitors